Larry Riley is the senior advisor to the General Manager of the  Atlanta Hawks of the National Basketball Association (NBA). He was formerly the general manager for Golden State Warriors before being demoted to director of scouting after Bob Myers's promotion to GM on April 24, 2012.  He was responsible for drafting Stephen Curry and Klay Thompson.

A graduate of Chadron State with an honors degree in education, Riley was inducted into the school's Athletic Hall of Fame in 1993. He received a master's degree in education from Southeast Missouri State. He is now also a "Basketball Player Development" instructor for the online sports-career training school Sports Management Worldwide, founded and run by Dr. Lynn Lashbrook.

References

Year of birth missing (living people)
Living people
Chadron State Eagles baseball players
Chadron State Eagles men's basketball players
College men's basketball head coaches in the United States
Dallas Mavericks assistant coaches
Eastern New Mexico Greyhounds men's basketball coaches
Golden State Warriors assistant coaches
Golden State Warriors executives
Milwaukee Bucks assistant coaches
National Basketball Association general managers
Place of birth missing (living people)